Petre Mândru (born 13 September 1935), also known as Pierre Mindru, is a Romanian former football goalkeeper.

He played for two games for Romania under coach Augustin Botescu at the 1960 European Nations' Cup quarter-finals where they were defeated by Czechoslovakia, who advanced to the final tournament. He spent his entire professional career with Progresul București, where he made over 200 league appearances.

After his playing days ended, Mândru became a coach and managed several Algerian and Moroccan clubs. He also managed clubs in Canada and the United States alongside his partner Eddie Firmani.

His son Christian Mindru was also a goalkeeper who played for Montreal Impact in the early 1990s.

Mândru ran a soccer school for children in Montreal, which lasted from 1984 to 2015.

Honours

Player
Progresul București
Romanian Cup: 1959–60

Manager
JS Kabylie
Algerian League: 1973–74

Notes

References

External links

Local hero Decaire recalls his NASL days with the Montreal Manic

1935 births
Living people
Romanian footballers
Romania international footballers
Olympic footballers of Romania
Association football goalkeepers
FC Progresul București players
Liga I players
Liga II players
Romanian football managers
Romanian expatriate football managers
Romanian expatriate sportspeople in Canada
Romanian expatriate sportspeople in Morocco
Romanian expatriate sportspeople in Algeria
Expatriate football managers in Algeria
Expatriate football managers in Morocco
Expatriate soccer managers in Canada
USISL coaches
JS Kabylie managers
Raja CA managers
COD Meknès managers
Hassania Agadir managers
Montreal Supra coaches
Sportspeople from Craiova
Botola managers